Cratoplastis diluta is a moth of the family Erebidae first described by Felder and Rogenhofer in 1874. It is found in French Guiana, Guyana, Brazil, Venezuela, Ecuador, Peru, Bolivia, Panama, Costa Rica, Honduras and Mexico.

References

Phaegopterina
Moths described in 1874